Olga Dovgun (born 1 September 1970) is a Kazakhstani sports shooter. She competed at the 2000, 2004, 2008 and 2012 Summer Olympics.

References

External links
 

1970 births
Living people
Kazakhstani female sport shooters
Olympic shooters of Kazakhstan
Shooters at the 2000 Summer Olympics
Shooters at the 2004 Summer Olympics
Shooters at the 2008 Summer Olympics
Shooters at the 2012 Summer Olympics
People from Shymkent
Kazakhstani people of Russian descent
Asian Games medalists in shooting
Shooters at the 1998 Asian Games
Shooters at the 2002 Asian Games
Shooters at the 2006 Asian Games
Shooters at the 2010 Asian Games
Shooters at the 2014 Asian Games
Asian Games gold medalists for Kazakhstan
Asian Games silver medalists for Kazakhstan
Asian Games bronze medalists for Kazakhstan
Medalists at the 1998 Asian Games
Medalists at the 2002 Asian Games
Medalists at the 2006 Asian Games
Medalists at the 2010 Asian Games
Medalists at the 2014 Asian Games
20th-century Kazakhstani women
21st-century Kazakhstani women